Bolotny (masculine), Bolotnaya (feminine), or Bolotnoye (neuter) is the name of several inhabited localities in Russia.

Urban localities
Bolotnoye, a town in Bolotninsky District of Novosibirsk Oblast

Rural localities
Bolotnaya, Mari El Republic, a village in Emekovsky Rural Okrug of Volzhsky District of the Mari El Republic
Bolotnaya, Novgorod Oblast, a village in Syrkovskoye Settlement of Novgorodsky District of Novgorod Oblast

Landmarks
Bolotnaya Square, a square in Moscow